Actresses is a 2009 South Korean mockumentary-style drama film directed by E J-yong.

Plot 
Six actresses—Youn Yuh-jung, Lee Mi-sook, Go Hyun-jung, Choi Ji-woo, Kim Min-hee and Kim Ok-bin, each portraying themselves—come together for a Vogue Korea magazine photo shoot at a studio in Cheongdam-dong, Seoul on Christmas Eve, resulting in a clash of egos between individuals not used to sharing the limelight.

Production 
Director E J-yong was first inspired to make the film after going out for a drink with actresses Youn Yuh-jung and Go Hyun-jung—both his close friends—and later recalled, "I wanted to create something unconventional. I wanted to show the public how charming actresses are in real life." Yoon and Go were cast in the film alongside Lee Mi-sook, Choi Ji-woo, Kim Min-hee and Kim Ok-bin, each of them agreeing to take part with no guarantee.

Actresses was made without a script, instead being filmed on a scene-by-scene basis with the actresses improvising their performances according to the given situation. E noted: "I provided the basis for conflict and the actresses took it from there. The six women represent Korean actresses as a whole, and instead of creating something fictional I thought it would be interesting to feature each actress' charms and show something real." The film includes a real-life confrontation between Go and Choi, with each admitting that their on-set relationship was strained, and Go saying that she felt envious of Choi's looks.

Release 
Actresses was released in South Korea on December 10, 2009. The film pulled in 508,243 admissions.

References

External links 
  
 
 
 

2009 films
2009 drama films
South Korean drama films
2000s mockumentary films
Films about actors
Films set in Seoul
Films directed by E J-yong
2000s Korean-language films
Showbox films
Sponge Entertainment films
2000s South Korean films